Demetrius Cesar Andrade (born February 26, 1988) is an American professional boxer. He has held multiple world championships in two weight classes, including the WBO light middleweight title between 2013-2015, the WBA (Regular) title in 2017, and the WBO middleweight title from 2018 to 2022. As an amateur he won the U.S. national championships and Golden Gloves twice each, a gold medal at the 2007 World Championships, and represented the U.S. at the 2008 Olympics; all in the welterweight division.

As of April 2021, Andrade is ranked as the world's third best active middleweight by The Ring magazine and the Transnational Boxing Rankings Board, and fourth by BoxRec.

Amateur career
Demetrius Andrade obtained arguably the most successful amateur boxing reputation amongst all Rhode Island fighters in history. A Providence native of Cape Verdean descent, southpaw Andrade began boxing in 1994 at the age of 6. His nickname "Boo Boo" quickly became well known amongst the locals and he later became a recognized name across the United States.

Andrade won the United States Amateur Boxing Championship in 2005, and repeated it in 2006 when he also won the National Golden Gloves. He again won the National Golden Gloves in 2007, but did not compete in the U.S. Amateurs that year due to injury. 

Andrade initially struggled at the international level, losing to Eastern Europe opponents at the World Cup in 2005 and 2006. However, he won the silver medal at the 2007 Pan American Games in Rio de Janeiro, losing in the gold medal match to Brazilian hometown favorite Pedro Lima by a narrow 7-6 margin.

He won gold at the 2007 World Amateur Boxing Championships, where he beat Kakhaber Zhvania, Dmitrijs Sostaks, 2005 silver medalist Magomed Nurutdinov, future champion Jack Culcay-Keth, and Adem Kılıççı in the semifinal round. He beat Non Boonjumnong of Thailand in the finals, a match in which Andrade inflicted a standing eight count upon Boonjumnong and was leading by a score of 11-3 in the second round when Boonjumnong retired with an injury to his right arm.

Andrade attempted one last amateur endeavor before deciding to become professional. At the Olympic trials he defeated hard-punching Keith Thurman 27:13  In 2008, Demetrius Andrade was honored with the satisfaction of representing the USA in the 2008 Beijing Olympics and he became known as one of the favorites to win a gold medal. He overcame Kakhaber Zhvania and the highly regarded Russian Andrey Balanov 14:3 to advance to the quarterfinals but he was shocked by Korean veteran Kim Jung-Joo 9:11 (Olympic results) in a controversial loss. Though unable to win an Olympic Gold Medal that year, Andrade decided to end his exceptional amateur campaign and become a professional.

Professional career

Light middleweight

Early career 
Demetrius Andrade became a professional boxer and had his first pro fight in October 2008.

He defeated Patrick Cape at Northern Quest Casino, Airway Heights, Washington in a second-round knockout. He went on to win a TKO over Eric Marriott before making his Friday Night Fights debut against Tom Joseph on March 6 with a 1st-round TKO victory. Only 2 weeks later, Demetrius beat Arnulfo Javier Romero in a second-round KO. On June 19, 2009 he won in a unanimous decision against Tony Hirsch and followed up with another KO against Chad Greenleaf in the second round.

Andrade went on to defeat John Williams by TKO in the 6th round, and Chris Chatman by unanimous decision. Andrade’s record jumped to an impressive 9-0 record after demolishing Italian boxer Bernardo Guereca, with a 1st-round KO. Demetrius defeated his next ten opponents, including five fights ending by KO and the others ending by unanimous decision.

Andrade vs. Martirosyan
An opportunity arose in the Summer of 2013 when the vacant WBO light middleweight title would be decided by one match between Andrade and Armenian contender Vanes Martirosyan (33-0-1, 21 KOs). Andrade was scheduled to fight titlist Zaurbek Baysangurov on July 6 in Kyiv, Ukraine. Baysangurov was stripped after suffering a back injury and being sidelined for an extended period of time. The fight took place on November 9, 2013, at the American Bank Center in Texas. The fight was originally scheduled to take place on September 7 at the Staples Center in Los Angeles. Andrade defeated Martirosyan via split decision with scores of 114–113, 117–110 and 112–115 to win the vacant WBO title. Andrade was knocked down in the first round from a left hook by Martirosyan after dominating the entire round. Andrade used his jab and quickness to control the majority of the fight.

Andrade vs. Rose
On March 20, 2014 it was confirmed that British boxer and mandatory challenger Brian Rose (25-1-1, 7 KO) would be the first defence of Andrade's world title reign. The fight would take place on June 14 at the Barclays Center in Brooklyn. Andrade dominated Rose, a British native via 7th-round TKO. Andrade was ahead on all scorecards (60-51 & 60-52 twice) at the time of stoppage. Rose was dropped hard by straight left hand from Andrade in the first round. In round 3, Andrade connected with a counter right hook, which put Rose on the canvas a second time. Referee Michael Griffin stepped in to put an end to the one-sided beatdown in round 7. Compubox showed Andrade landed 149 of 452 total punches (33%), while Rose connected on a minor 30 of 179 total punches (17%). The fight advanced Andrade to an outstanding 21-0 with 14 knockouts. Andrade put in a dominant performance to claim his place as a top champion in order to lure a future fight with the division best including Canelo Álvarez and Floyd Mayweather. For the fight, Andrade earned $200,000 compared to Rose, who earned a $100,000 purse. The fight averaged 882,000 viewers on HBO.

Andrade vs. Charlo negotiations 
Andrade was scheduled to fight Jermell Charlo (24-0, 11 KOs) at Mandalay Bay Resort & Casino on December 13, 2014, defending his WBO title. On November 16 was cancelled due to purse issues. Andrade was reportedly offered $250,000, but later increased to what would be a career high $300,000 purse. In January 2015, Banner Promotions stated the fight was back on and likely to take place in the Spring of 2015. The following month, Star Boxing and Banner Promotions announced a deal was being worked out, however, Andrade would ultimately pull out. In August 2015, Andrade sued entertainment agency Roc Nation alleging they had persuaded him to reject a $550K offer to face Charlo along with a three-fight deal with Showtime in exchange for a separate deal that did not materialize.

Inactivity and comeback 
After 13 months with no title defenses and none scheduled, Andrade was stripped of the title by the World Boxing Organization Committee. On September 11, 2014, it was announced that the WBO had granted a request by Andrade's promoter to have him to challenge for the vacant WBO middleweight title against Matt Korobov. Andrade's father and trainer, Paul Andrade, stated "I would like to thank the WBO for having faith in us and giving us the opportunity,". However, less than a month later, it was announced that Andrade had elected to pull out of the fight and continue campaigning at the junior middleweight division.

On September 16, 2015 Banner Promotions and Star Boxing announced that Andrade would return to the ring after 16 months of inactivity against 28 year old Argentine boxer Dario Fabian Pucheta (20-2, 11 KOs) for the vacant WBA International light middleweight title at the Mohegan Sun Casino in Uncasville, Connecticut on October 17. In a statement, Andrade said, "It's about time that I get back in the ring. I am happy to be fighting [near] home in front of my fans." Andrade headlined the card. Andrade won the vacant regional title by knocking out Pucheta in the second round. Andrade started strong dropping Pucheta in round 1 following a straight left. Pucheta was dropped again in the opening round when Andrade landed a right uppercut. Another right hand in round 2 ended the bout.

Andrade vs. Nelson 
ESPN reported that Andrade would take part in a Showtime-televised tripleheader in a WBC light middleweight final eliminator against 28 year old contender Willie Nelson (25-2-1, 15 KOs) on June 11, 2016 at the Turning Stone Resort & Casino in Verona, New York. Andrade defeated Nelson via a 12th round stoppage. The win put Andrade in line for a WBC title shot against then-newly crowned champion Jermell Charlo. Andrade knocked Nelson down four times throughout the fight before it finally came to an end. The final knockdown occurred in round 12 following a right hand. Referee Dick Pakozdi then stopped the fight at 1:38 of the round. The other knockdowns appeared in round 1, 11 and 12, before the final knockdown. With Nelson looking hesitant to throw punches, it allowed Andrade to work over and continiusly land at will. Following the fight, Andrade said, "I’m coming to get those belts.People can’t run no more. The best have to fight the best. I’m coming for them. I came back, I’m stronger. Me and my team worked hard. We figured out what we need to do to take it to the next level. I’m ready for the Charlo brothers. I want them."

Andrade, although he was mandatory for Jermell Charlo's WBC title, made it known that he was also targeting a fight with long-time WBA 'super' champion Erislany Lara (23-2-2, 13 KOs), who was also regarded one of the best at 154 pounds. Andrade's promoter Artie Pellulo told ESPN, "I'm going to ask Stephen (Espinoza) if he is interested in doing a fight between Demetrius and Lara." However, Andrade later stated he'd only face Lara as a "last resort", preferring to face Jack Culcay for a lesser title with the goal of securing a fight with Jermell Charlo in the future; “He [Lara] won’t engage or try and make the fight entertaining, especially if it’s coming into my favor,” Andrade explained. “He’s just going to survive, try to run, try to do the little pitty-pat counter punches."

Andrade vs. Culcay
Andrade agreed terms to fight Jack Culcay (22-1, 11 KOs) for the WBA 'Regular' light middleweight title at the MBS Arena in Potsdam, Brandenburg on November 5, 2016. Sauerland Event won the purse bid for the fight at $425,144, 25% of which will go to Andrade. Showtime confirmed they would not be broadcasting the fight, despite interest in Andrade, due to them not wanting to go head to head with Manny Pacquiao's return on that same date. Andrade defeated Culcay in the amateurs on the way to winning gold at the 2007 World Championships. The fight was cancelled after it was revealed Andrade's camp had failed to meet several deadlines the WBA had set for the official contracts to be signed. The contract was eventually signed, however as they have failed to meet the deadlines given by the WBA and Team Sauerland, the fight remained cancelled.

On January 14, 2017 reports suggested that a contract had been signed between Andrade and Culcay to fight for the WBA 'Regular' title on March 11. The fight was officially confirmed weeks later to take place at the Freidrich-Ebert-Halle in Ludwigshafen, Germany. Andrade became a two time world champion after winning the WBA 'Regular' title via split decision. Two judges scored the bout 116–112 for Andrade whilst the third had it 115–114 for Culcay. The fight was regarded as close, with as many as five rounds being tossed between the two. Sky Sports pundits had Andrade a clear close winner as he outworked Culcay. In the post fight interview, Andrade credited his performance, "I thought I did everything that I needed to do. I came to Germany and took the title. Culcay came like a champion, but I was the better man. I outlanded him and I came out with the victory." He also stated that he was happy to be back in the world title mix and defend against the best 154 pound fighters.

Middleweight

Andrade vs. Fox 
On September 14, 2017 it was announced that Andrade would appear on a HBO card, as part of his new multi-fight deal on October 21 as a co-feature to Jezreel Corrales vs. Alberto Machado at the Turning Stone in Verona, New York. His opponent was revealed to be Alantez Fox (23-0-1, 11 KOs), who would be taking a significant step up in competition. It was also revealed the fight would be a non-title fight at middleweight. Fox, a natural middleweight, has been fighting at the weight since 2012. On fight night, Andrade put in a solid performance, winning the fight after 12 rounds via unanimous decision. The three judges' scored the fight 118–110, 118–109, and 116–111 in his favour. Andrade hurt Fox in the opening round and looked as though he would be able finish the fight inside the distance. Instead, Fox went to defense mode and made Andrade work for the decision. In round 7, Andrade slipped during an exchange with Fox. When Andrade got back to his feet, he was shocked to see the referee counting, ruling the slip as an official knockdown. Replays showed that Fox did not land a punch in the exchange. Andrade continued to use his jab and left hand to control the fight. ComputBox stats showed that through the 12 rounds, Fox 52 of 301 punches thrown (17%). Andrade, who was the clear winner after 12 rounds, landed 158 of his 572 thrown (27%), which included 49% of his power punches landed.

Andrade felt he did well in his debut at middleweight and believed there was always room for improvement. He said, "I did everything I needed to do. It was a great experience to go 12 rounds at this weight. Fox is a tough kid, and after I hurt him early in the first round, he recovered well. He wasn't sloppy and he knew how to survive, so that is why I did not finish him." It was revealed that Andrade vacated his WBA 'Regular' light middleweight title before the fight, in order to get ranked immediately at middleweight, which would eventually earn him a title opportunity. The fight drew an average of 613,000 viewers and peaked at 685,000 viewers on HBO.

Promotional changes 
On June 20, 2018 it was reported by ESPN's Dan Rafael that HBO would air Andrade against 2012 Olympic bronze medalist Yamaguchi Falcão (15-0, 7 KOs) on the undercard of Jaime Munguía's WBO light middleweight title defence against Liam Smith on July 21 at the Hard Rock Hotel & Casino in Las Vegas. The fight was confirmed on June 26, however a day later, Andrade announced that he had split with Star Boxing & Banner Promotions, who had both co-promoted Andrade for 10 years. It was a mutual decision from all parties. Andrade said, “It’s been a long journey. I’ve learned a lot and I really appreciate everything that Artie (Pelullo of Banner Promotions) and Joe (DeGuardia of Star Boxing) did for me and my career. Sometimes it seemed like it was us against the whole world trying to get the top fighters to get in the ring with me but at the end of the day Artie and Joe guided me to two World Championships and I really want to thank them for all their efforts! I’m hoping to be back in the ring again very soon and get an opportunity to show the world that I’m going to be a World Champion once again!" Andrade declared himself a promotional free agent. According to The Ring, Andrade bought out the remainder of his contract. The fight with Falcao was cancelled.

Andrade vs. Kautondokwa 
On July 12, the WBO ordered Billy Joe Saunders (26-0, 12 KOs) to make a mandatory defence against Andrade, with both sides having 10 days to reach a deal. On July 13, it was reported that Andrade would be unveiled as one of Eddie Hearn's Matchroom Boxing USA's signing with a deal that would see him fighting on DAZN. On July 17, at the official launch, Andrade was introduced as one of Matchroom Boxing USA's signings. At this point, it was revealed Andrade would likely make his ring return in October 2018 however there was no confirmation whether Hearn would participate in the purse bid for Saunders vs. Andrade. On 25 July, the purse bid, which was scheduled for the evening, was cancelled after it was revealed that Eddie Hearn and Frank Warren had reached a deal for the fight to take place in USA under the Matchroom USA banner on DAZN. It was said that representatives of Top Rank were scheduled to be present at the purse bid to try and secure the fight for ESPN+. With Matchroom USA having promotional rights on the fight, Warren confirmed the fight would take place on Sky Sports in the United Kingdom and not BT Sport. On 9 August, according to Hearn, the fight would take place at the TD Garden in Boston, Massachusetts on 20 October.

On 27 September, ESPN's Dan Rafael first reported that Saunders had tested positive for banned substance oxilofrine, known as a stimulant. The test was carried out by the Voluntary Anti-Doping Association (VADA) on 30 August. Hearn stated he would wait to see if the Massachusetts commission will allow Saunders to fight, however confirmed Andrade would still appear in the main event, whether it be a vacant world title or a non-title bout. Promoter Warren claimed the positive test was due to a nasal spray and was permitted by UKAD. The BBBofC also stated Saunders was not in breach of their regulations. At a hearing, the MSAC denied Saunders a license, meaning he could not defend his title against Andrade. According to reports, the cancellation meant Saunders team would be losing around $2.3 million. WBO president, Paco Valcarcel told ESPN, Saunders would not be stripped immediately, as Saunders would likely appeal and Andrade's fight against Namibian boxer Walter Kautondokwa (17-0, 16 KOs), who at the time was ranked #2 with the WBO, would be for the vacant WBO intertim title. On October 11, Saunders voluntarily vacated the title, which meant the bout would be for the full WBO title. According to sources, Andrade was still set to receive his $800,000 purse for the fight.

In front of 6,874 in attendance, Andrade became a two-weight world champion, capturing the vacant WBO title after he dropped Kautondokwa four times in the fight en route to winning via unanimous decision. The scorecards read 120–104, 120–104 and 119–105 in Andrade's favour. At least two of the knockdowns were due to balance issues. In the opening round, Andrade dropped Kautondokwa with a left to the head. While Kautondokwa was on the canvas, Andrade hit him again with a shot to the head that badly hurt him.Referee Steve Willis did not acknowledge the foul. Late in round 3, Andrade landed left hand to the jaw that dropped Kautondokwa for a second time. Reaching the 2 minute mark in round 4, Andrade landed overhand left that sent Kautondokwa to the canvas for the third rime in the fight. At the same time, Kautondokwa landed a left hand which forced Andrade's glove to touch the canvas, however referee Willis did not credit Kautondokwa's knockdown. Kautondokwa got up, but shortly hit with a straight left, sending him down again. At the midway point of the fight, Andrade had wide lead on the scorecards. He then stayed away from Kautondokwa’s powerful right hand by circling the ring in the last half of the contest. Occasionally, Andrade was hit hard by Kautondokwa, but he was able to handle his power. After the fight, Andrade said, "After a one-year layoff, my second bout at 160, [I am] the new middleweight champion of the world, Demetrius Andrade. I feel good. I definitely think I carried my power well, and we're just going to keep building and growing for the 160-pound division, and I want to fight the best out there." He also praised Kautondokwa for his toughness. According to CompuBox, Andrade landed 152 of 501 punches thrown (30%), and Kautondokwa landed 45 of his 325 thrown (14%). Kautondokwa did not land more than 8 punches in a single round.

Middleweight

Andrade vs. Akavov 
On 18 January 2019, Andrade made his first WBO belt defence against Artur Akavov, who was ranked #8 by the WBO at middleweight. Andrade dominated through most of the fight, and managed to stop Akavov in the final round, with 2:36 left on the clock.

Andrade vs. Sulecki 
His second WBO middleweight title defence came against WBO's number 2 Maciej Sulecki. Andrade dropped his challenger once midway through the first round, en route to a dominant unanimous decision win.

Andrade vs. Keeler 
On January 30, 2020, Andrade fought Luke Keeler, ranked #3 by the WBO and #10 by the IBF at middleweight. Andrade managed to score two early knockdowns. In the ninth, Andrade went on the offensive and tried to close the fight by unleashing a flurry of punches on Keeler, which prompted the referee to stop the fight and award Andrade the TKO win.

Andrade vs. Hernández-Harrison 
Andrade's next fight will be against the undefeated Dusty Hernández-Harrison in a non-title fight at the super middleweight limit of 168 pounds. The ten-round fight will be on November 27 at the Seminole Hard Rock Hotel & Casino in Hollywood, Florida. The bout would be televised on DAZN and promoted by Eddie Hearn's Matchroom Boxing. However, Hernández-Harrison tested positive for COVID-19 and had to pull out of th fight. The fight got cancelled and Demetrius Andrade looked for a new opponent.

Andrade vs. Williams 
The WBO ordered Demetrius Andrade to defend his title to mandatory challenger Liam Williams. A fight was agreed for April 17 at the Seminole Hard Rock Hotel & Casino in Hollywood, Florida. Andrade fought Williams, ranked #3 by the WBO, scoring a knockdown in round two. The fight went the distance, with all judges scoring the bout in favour of Andrade.

Andrade vs. Quigley 
On November 19, 2021, he defeated Jason Quigley by second round TKO

Vacating middleweight title and withdrawing from super middleweight title eliminator 
Following his win over Quigley, the WBO ordered him to make a mandatory title defense against Janibek Alimkhanuly After several postponements with the deadline being reached, the WBO allowed Andrade to move up in weight to face Zach Parker for the interim super middleweight title instead, while allowing him to keep the middleweight championship as well. Andrade later withdrew from the fight with Parker, citing an injury during training camp.

On 20 July 2022, the WBO once again ordered Andrade to defend his title against Alimkhanuly, giving the pair 30 days to come to terms. In August, it was reported that Andrade would vacate his middleweight title to revisit negotiations with Parker in a mandatory eliminator fight for the WBO super middleweight title held by Canelo Alvarez.  Andrade officially vacated the middleweight title later that month. In September 2022, it was reported that Andrade had chosen to withdraw from the Parker eliminator fight as well citing his dissatisfaction with the purse.

Demond Nicholson 
After 14 months of inactivity, Andrade returned to the ring against journeyman Demond Nicholson in a non-title fight scheduled for 10 rounds. Andrade scored two knockdowns and earned a unanimous decision victory. In the 5th round, Nicholson appeared to drop Andrade for a flash knockdown with a body shot, however, it was ruled a slip by the referee.

Outside of boxing 
On December 6, 2018 it was reported that Andrade had been arrested after he was caught driving in his Mercedes with a Glock 19 pistol. The pistol was found in a Louis Vuitton bag. After doing some checks, the Providence Police found that Andrade did not have a permit to hold the gun. According to the reports, Andrade told the police he had the gun because of his 'fame and wealth', however the detective Maj. David Lapatin explained there was no reason not to have a permit regardless. Two policemen, who were driving along the road at 2:30 a.m. local time, originally came over to Andrade's car after he was seen blocking traffic talking to another person in a Mercedes. The police also found a magazine with 10 rounds in the bag. Andrade was released on bail the same day.

Professional boxing record

References

External links

2007 World Amateur Championship results
Demetrius Andrade amateur boxing record
Demetrius Andrade - Profile, News Archive & Current Rankings at Box.Live

1988 births
Living people
Sportspeople from Providence, Rhode Island
Boxers from Rhode Island
National Golden Gloves champions
Winners of the United States Championship for amateur boxers
World Boxing Organization champions
Boxers at the 2007 Pan American Games
Boxers at the 2008 Summer Olympics
Olympic boxers of the United States
American male boxers
AIBA World Boxing Championships medalists
Pan American Games silver medalists for the United States
Pan American Games medalists in boxing
World Boxing Association champions
World light-middleweight boxing champions
Welterweight boxers
Southpaw boxers
World middleweight boxing champions
Medalists at the 2007 Pan American Games
American people of Cape Verdean descent